The 1918 AAA Championship Car season consisted of 16 races, beginning in Uniontown, Pennsylvania on May 16 and concluding there on September 2. There were also 3 non-championship races. The de facto National Champion as poled by the American automobile journal Motor Age was Ralph Mulford.  The Indianapolis 500 was not held this year.  Points were not awarded by the AAA Contest Board during the 1918 season. Champions of the day were decided by Chris G. Sinsabaugh, an editor at Motor Age, based on merit and on track performance. The points table was created retroactively in 1927 – all championship results should be considered unofficial.

Schedule and results

Leading National Championship standings

The points paying system for the 1909–1915 and 1917–1919 season were retroactively applied in 1927 and revised in 1951 using the points system from 1920.

References
http://www.champcarstats.com/year/1918.htm accessed 12/1/15
http://www.teamdan.com/archive/gen/indycar/1918.html accessed 12/1/15

AAA Championship Car season
AAA Championship Car
AAA Championship Car